FM Conway is a UK-based civil engineering contractor specialising in highways and other infrastructure work.

Founded in 1961 by Francis (Frank) Michael Conway, it has a network of asphalt and aggregate recycling manufacturing plants serving London and the south of England, as well as a Thames-side wharf. The company was based in Dartford, Kent, but in 2015 announced a plan to move its headquarters to Sevenoaks, also in Kent.

In February 2020, FM Conway was suspended from the Prompt Payment Code for failure to pay suppliers on time. It was reinstated in August 2020 after process improvements."

In February 2022, FM Conway and subcontractors Freyssinet and Taziker Industrial were set to start work on the restoration of Hammersmith Bridge in west London.

In the year ending 31 March 2022, FM Conway had revenues of £478.1m, up from £338.2m in 2021, with much of the growth due to the March 2021 acquisition of Toppesfield, which brought an addition £80m of turnover. Pre-tax profit was down 13% to £17.2m (2021: £19.8m).

References

Companies based in Kent
Construction and civil engineering companies of the United Kingdom
1961 establishments in England